Javaid Rehman is a British-Pakistani legal scholar and Professor of Islamic Law and International Law at Brunel University London.

Special Rapporteur on human rights in Iran
On 7 July 2018, he was appointed as the United Nations Special Rapporteur on the human rights situation in the Islamic Republic of Iran.
On 6 August 2018, Javaid Rehman, wrote to the Iranian Government expressing his interest in visiting Iran. He said he had already received a number of reports raising concerns about alleged violations of human rights in the country. He commenced his duties officially on 13 July 2018.

Works 
 Indigenous Peoples and Ethnic Minorities of Pakistan: Constitutional and Legal Perspectives (2013)

References

External links 
Rehman's CV

Living people
United Nations special rapporteurs
Date of birth missing (living people)
British legal scholars
Pakistani legal scholars
Academics of Brunel University London
International law scholars
Alumni of the University of Hull
Scholars of Islamic jurisprudence
British officials of the United Nations
Pakistani officials of the United Nations
Year of birth missing (living people)